Skalny (masculine), Skalnaya (feminine), or Skalnoye (neuter) is the name of several inhabited localities in Russia.

Urban localities
Skalny, Perm Krai, a work settlement under the administrative jurisdiction of the town of krai significance of Chusovoy in Perm Krai

Rural localities
Skalny, Rostov Oblast, a settlement in Bogurayevskoye Rural Settlement of Belokalitvinsky District in Rostov Oblast